VSK Aarhus (earlier IK Skovbakken) is a Danish women's football team from Risskov, Aarhus. It is the women's section of VSK Aarhus.

The team was originally created as the women's football section of Hjortshøj-Egå IF, a.k.a. HEI Aarhus. It was the leading team in the 1980s, winning eight championships between 1982 and 1991 including a six-year winning streak. It subsequently won the two first editions of the national cup in 1993 and 1994, and two more championships in 1997 and 1998.

In 2002 the team was transferred to IK Skovbakken. It won its first title as such, its third national cup, in 2009. It also reached the final in 2003, 2006 and 2010. In the Elitedivisionen it has usually ranked third, with Brøndby IF and Fortuna Hjørring dominating the championship.

In 2016 IK Skovbakken and Vejlby IK Fodbold merged into VSK Aarhus which is short for Vejlby Skovbakken Aarhus.

Titles
 Elitedivisionen
Winner (10): 1982, 1984, 1986, 1987, 1988, 1989, 1990, 1991, 1997, 1998
 Danish Cup
Winner (3): 1993, 1994, 2009

Team

Current squad

Competition record

References

Women's football clubs in Denmark
Association football clubs established in 2002
Sport in Aarhus
2002 establishments in Denmark